Richard Neal is a United States Representative from Massachusetts's 1st congressional district, formerly numbered as the 2nd district.

Richard Neal may also refer to:
Richard Neal (American football) (1947–1983), American football defensive end
Richard I. Neal (born 1942), U.S. Marine Corps general
Richard Neal (police officer) (born 1940), police commissioner of Philadelphia, Pennsylvania, 1992–1998

See also
Dick Neal (disambiguation)
Richard Neile, English bishop
Richard Neill (1875–1970), American actor
Richard FitzNeal (died 1198), churchman and bureaucrat in the service of Henry II of England